Schilcher may refer to:
 Schilcher (wine), an Austrian rosé-style wine
 Heinz Schilcher (1947–2018), retired Austrian football player and manager
 Franz Schilcher (born 1943), Austrian ice hockey player